Heydar Babaya Salam is an Azerbaijani poetical work by Mohammad Hossein Shahriar, a famous Iranian Azerbaijani poet. Published in 1954 in Tabriz, it is about Shahriar's childhood and his memories of his village Khoshgenab near Tabriz. Heydar Baba is the name of a mountain overlooking the village.

In Heydar Babaya Salam Shahriar narrates a nostalgia from his childhood in a village in Iranian Azerbaijan.

In describing Heydar Baba, Shahryar uses the Azeri Turkish word regime toward Azerbaijanis. Here, in every part of Azerbaijan, a Heydar Baba rises up and becomes a gigantic wall that supports and protects Azerbaijan against its foes.

Sources

Notes
English and Turkish Translation of Heydar Babaya Salam  (University of Michigan)
Audio file (mp3) of Heydar Babaya Salam 
Salam bih Haydar Baba and Salam bé Heydar Baba: in Azerbaijani, with Persian translation by Bahman Fursi (1993)  - See: Copac library catalogue
English translation
Şəhriyar - Heydər Babaya salam-1 (audio) 

1954 poems
Azerbaijani poetry